The 1906 Minnesota lieutenant gubernatorial election took place on November 6, 1906. Republican Party of Minnesota candidate Adolph Olson Eberhart defeated Minnesota Democratic Party challenger Lloyd G. Pendergast and Prohibition Party candidate Ole Lokensgaard.

Results

External links
 Election Returns

Lieutenant Gubernatorial
Minnesota
1906